An Officer and a Spy is a 2019 historical drama film directed by Roman Polanski about the Dreyfus affair, with a screenplay by Polanski and Robert Harris based on Harris's 2013 novel of the same name. The name J'Accuse has its origins in Émile Zola's bold article in l'Aurore in January 1898 in which the famous author accused many persons of France of continuing to support the increasingly blatantly erroneous accusations against Dreyfus.

The film had its premiere at the 76th Venice International Film Festival on 30 August 2019, winning the Grand Jury Prize and the FIPRESCI Prize. It received twelve nominations for the 45th César Awards, the most nominations of any eligible film, and eventually won the awards for Best Adaptation, Best Costume Design, and Best Director. The film was also nominated in four categories at the 32nd European Film Awards, including for Best Film, Best Director, Best Actor, and Best Screenwriter, ultimately winning none. It received David di Donatello and Polish Film Awards nominations as Best Foreign and Best European film respectively.

Plot
In 1894, Alfred Dreyfus, captain in the French army, is found guilty of high treason for passing military secrets to the German Empire. He is degraded and condemned to exile on Devil's Island; his affair triggers a noticeable echo in France since Dreyfus is Jewish. One year later, officer Georges Picquart, former superior of Dreyfus himself, is appointed head of the secret service section in the French army (Deuxième Bureau). The man, despite alleged anti-Semitic sentiments, is aware that the trial against Dreyfus was rather summary and biased by his origin; therefore, noticing some irregularities in the dossier of the affair, he decides to conduct an investigation to verify the man's guilt. Picquart discovers that the so-called bordereau, the document that would prove his guilt, was not written by Dreyfus, as the graphologist Alphonse Bertillon had declared, but by another soldier: Major Ferdinand Walsin Esterhazy. According to Picquart, he is the real spy, but the evidence has been prejudiced or even falsified to the detriment of Dreyfus.

Picquart is convinced of Dreyfus' innocence and tries to reopen the trial to exonerate him and arrest Esterhazy, but meets the opposition of his superiors: admitting Dreyfus' innocence would result in a great scandal that would lead to the discovery of corruption in the army, while the man, as a Jew, is the perfect scapegoat. Picquart is then removed from office and sent on a mission far from Paris. However, he manages to return and tell everything to his friend, the lawyer Louis Leblois, who begins to organise a committee for the rehabilitation of Dreyfus, involving his colleague Fernand Labori, members of the Parliament and intellectuals, including the famous author Émile Zola.

Picquart's insubordination leads to his arrest, but on the same day Zola publishes in the newspaper L'Aurore the article entitled J'accuse, which would become famous, where he fiercely criticises the irregularities of the trial of Dreyfus and exposes all the people involved in the case. Zola, on a complaint from the government, is tried for defamation and, due to the false declarations made in the courtroom by the soldiers called to witness, the writer is sentenced to one year in prison. While the whole of France is divided between innocent and guilty parties, the intellectuals signing the pro-Dreyfus petition are targeted by popular hatred. Later, after losing a duel against Picquart, Lieutenant Colonel Hubert Joseph Henry, who had testified against Dreyfus, admits he perjured himself, and died shortly after, apparently by suicide.

Following Henry's depositions, Picquart is acquitted and released, while Dreyfus is repatriated for a second trial; shortly before the decisive hearing, the lawyer Labori suffers an assassination attempt and is unable to defend Dreyfus. The man is sentenced again, but the sentence to be served is made lighter by the recognition of the extenuating circumstances. In 1899, the Prime Minister grants Dreyfus a pardon. Picquart would like to continue fighting to prove his innocence, but Dreyfus, exhausted, accepts it. Seven years later there will be full acquittal and reintegration into the army.

In 1907, Picquart is appointed Minister of War, also thanks to the recognition of the judicial error to the detriment of him. Dreyfus asks him for an audience and protests because the years in which he has unfairly served his sentence have not been recognised, preventing him from reaching the rank of lieutenant colonel. Picquart cannot make this concession to him as the political climate has changed again, which causes Dreyfus' outrage. The two men greet each other with respect, never to see each other again.

Cast

Jean Dujardin as Colonel Georges Picquart             
Louis Garrel as Captain Alfred Dreyfus              
Emmanuelle Seigner as Pauline Monnier         
Grégory Gadebois as Hubert-Joseph Henry              
Hervé Pierre as Charles-Arthur Gonse      
Wladimir Yordanoff as Auguste Mercier          
Didier Sandre as Raoul Le Mouton de Boisdeffre     
Melvil Poupaud as Fernand Labori             
Éric Ruf as Jean Sandherr     
Mathieu Amalric as Alphonse Bertillon              
Laurent Stocker as Georges-Gabriel de Pellieux       
Vincent Perez as Louis Leblois
Michel Vuillermoz as Armand du Paty de Clam 
Vincent Grass as Jean-Baptiste Billot              
Laurent Natrella as Ferdinand Walsin Esterhazy      
Bruno Raffaelli as Juge Delegorgue                  
Pierre Poirot as officier Vallecalle 
Paulo Henrique as officer of état major         
Stefan Godin as General Darr     
Luca Barbareschi as Philippe Monnier           
Mohammed Lakhdar-Hamina as Bachir       
Luce Mouchel as Madame Sandherr              
Fabien Tucci as Sûreté agent        
Franck Mercadal as Capitaine Calmont        
Philippe Magnan as Attorney Brisset              
Pierre Forest as Colonel Maurel             
Jeanne Rosa as Martha Leblois             
Benoît Allemane as Georges Charpentier           
Ludovic Paris as Arthur Ranc              
Gérard Chaillou as Georges Clemenceau             
Nicolas Bridet as Mathieu Dreyfus              
André Marcon as Émile Zola              
Jean-Marie Frin as President of the Jury              
Swan Starosta as Lucie Dreyfus 
Thierry Gimenez as Colonel Jouaust    
Denis Podalydès as Maître Demange

Production
Robert Harris was inspired to write the novel by his friend Polanski, who has long had an interest in the Dreyfus affair. Harris followed the novel with a script of the same story, titled D, with Polanski announced as director in 2012.

This film was the third occasion Harris has worked with Polanski. Harris previously co-wrote The Ghost Writer with Polanski, which was also an adaptation of one of Harris's novels, The Ghost. The two first worked together in 2007 on a film adaptation of Harris's novel Pompeii, which was cancelled just before filming due to a looming actors' strike.

Although set in Paris, the film was first scheduled to shoot in Warsaw in 2014, for economic reasons. Production was postponed after Polanski moved to Poland for filming, and the US government filed extradition papers. The Polish government eventually rejected them. By that point, new French film tax credits had been introduced, which allowed the film to shoot on location in Paris.

The film was budgeted at €60m and was next set to start production in July 2016, but its production was postponed again while Polanski waited on the availability of a star, whose name was never announced.

Filming began on 26 November 2018 and was completed on 28 April 2019. The film was produced by Alain Goldman's Légende Films and distributed by Gaumont.

Release
The film had its world premiere at the Venice Film Festival on 30 August 2019. At the Venice Film Festival, the film won the Grand Jury Prize. It was released in France on 13 November 2019, and in Italy on 21 November 2019.

Reception
On Metacritic, the film holds a rating of 56 out of 100, based on nine critics, indicating "mixed or average reviews". The film received a standing ovation during its premiere in Venice. 

David Sexton, writing for the Evening Standard, gave the film a rating of four out of five, declaring that: "It's an absolute masterclass in how to make a historical film".

The film has received backlash due to parallels Polanski allegedly made between his sexual abuse case and the film's plot.

Controversy 
Polanski's attendance at the Venice Film Festival was his first appearance at a major film event since he was expelled from the Academy of Motion Picture Arts and Sciences in May 2018. During the festival, the head of the jury Lucrecia Martel stated: "I don't separate the man from the art. I think that important aspects of the work emerges in the man. [...] A man who commits a crime of this size who is then condemned, and the victim considers herself satisfied with the compensation is difficult for me to judge... It is difficult to define what is the right approach we have to take with people who have committed certain acts and were judged for them. I think these questions are part of the debate in our times." Martel also stated she would not attend a gala dinner in support of the film. 

Polanski's producers threatened to pull the film from the festival lineup. Martel later clarified her comments, stating: "According to some reports after today's press conference, I believe my words were deeply misunderstood. Since I don't separate the work from the author and I have recognized a lot of humanity in Polanski's previous films, I am not opposed to the presence of the film in competition. I don't have any prejudice towards it and of course I will watch the film like any other in the competition. If I had any prejudice, I would have resigned my duty as the president of the jury." 

Alberto Barbera, the festival director of Venice, had previously defended the film being in the lineup, stating: "We are here to see works of art, not to judge the person behind it. I hope we can just discuss about the quality of the film and not about Polanski and the case with L.A. County."

U.S. distribution companies rejected invitations to a buyers' presentation during the Cannes Film Festival. Howard Cohen of Roadside Attractions stated: "I think we would consider it, though I'm not even sure how I personally feel. People have been releasing his films for years. Now, we are looking at it through a different lens, with good reason. We have to search our souls if it's the right thing to do. What does it mean to release this movie? I don't think that's a settled question even in my mind."

In November 2019, five days before the official release of An Officer and a Spy in France, Polanski faced accusations of rape by a French woman, Valentine Monnier. Upon the release, French feminist groups invaded or blockaded several cinemas, having the film cancelled in some places.

When the film was nominated for 12 César Awards in January 2020, women's groups said that the French film academy was acclaiming "an abuser and rapist on the run". Eventually, Polanski as well as other crew members of An Officer and a Spy did not attend the 45th César Awards ceremony. No one was there to accept the awards on Polanski's behalf. The César Award for Best Director to Polanski was poorly received by the audience. Several people walked out in disgust, including Best Actress nominee Adèle Haenel.

Accolades

References

External links
 
 
 
 
 An Officer and a Spy at Filmaffinity

2019 films
2019 drama films
French drama films
Italian drama films
French courtroom films
2010s French-language films
Fictional duos
Films directed by Roman Polanski
Films about the Dreyfus affair
Films set in 1894
Films whose director won the Best Director César Award
Films shot in Paris
Films with screenplays by Roman Polanski
Venice Grand Jury Prize winners
2010s French films